Mad Dog Time (also known as Trigger Happy) is a 1996 American ensemble crime comedy film written and directed by Larry Bishop and starring Ellen Barkin, Gabriel Byrne, Richard Dreyfuss, Jeff Goldblum and Diane Lane. The film is notable for the various cameo appearances, including the first, and final film appearance by Christopher Jones in over a quarter-century.

Plot synopsis
The story takes place in a mysterious underworld of swanky nightclubs where armed criminals listen to Rat Pack music and hold shootouts from a seated position, behind desks. Mickey Holliday is the top enforcer for Vic, the mob boss, who is about to be released from a psychiatric facility. In his absence, Ben London has been running Vic's nightclub while Mickey has been romancing both Rita and Grace Everly, which is doubly dangerous inasmuch as they are sisters and Grace was previously Vic's girl.

A rival, Jake Parker, recruits a number of hired guns in an attempt to seize power. Mickey kills the first to challenge him, Lee Turner. The next one brought in by Parker, identified as Nicholas Falco and supposedly the fastest draw of all, murders Mickey's close friend, Jules Flamingo, who is unarmed. A showdown is arranged and Mickey ends up eliminating both Parker and the apparently overrated Falco.

Vic returns to resume his reign as mob boss. He brings with him a new enforcer, the "real" Nicholas Falco, the previous one having been an impostor. "Brass Balls" Ben London promptly challenges Vic for control of the organization (while singing "My Way" on stage in the nightclub) and is shot dead. Falco proceeds to gun down the remaining opposition, including "Wacky" Jackie Jackson, and is eager to shoot it out with Mickey Holliday once and for all.

Mickey attempts to repair his relationship with Rita, who is furious that he has been seeing her sister on the side. Mickey finally confesses to Grace that he has been seeing her in the daytime and Rita at night. She also has been unaware that Vic is back in town. At a final confrontation held in a private office, Grace reveals that she is pregnant with Vic's child. Forced to choose between Holliday and Falco before they shoot it out, Vic sides with his old friend and Grace kills Falco. He and Mickey end up (apparently) living happily ever after with the Everly sisters.

Cast
 Jeff Goldblum as Mickey Holliday
 Richard Dreyfuss as Vic
 Gabriel Byrne as Ben London
 Ellen Barkin as Rita Everly
 Diane Lane as Grace Everly
 Gregory Hines as Jules Flamingo
 Kyle MacLachlan as Jake Parker
 Burt Reynolds as Jackie Jackson
 Larry Bishop as Nicholas Falco
 Henry Silva as Sleepy Joe
 Michael J. Pollard as Red
 Christopher Jones as fake Falco
 Billy Idol as Lee Turner
 Angie Everhart as Gabriella
 Billy Drago as Wells
 Paul Anka as Danny
 Rob Reiner as Albert
 Joey Bishop as Gottlieb
 Richard Pryor as Jimmy the Gravedigger
 Frank Licari as Vic's Guy

Cameo appearances
The writer-director's father, Joey Bishop, is seen briefly and speaks one word: "Hello." His character runs Gottlieb's Mortuary; Gottlieb being Bishop's real name.

Richard Pryor appears as Gottlieb's sidekick, Jimmy the Grave Digger. Despite his character being mentioned throughout the film, he is in only one scene, and speaks a few lines. He is shown in a wheelchair, and his voice is garbled. His physical deterioration was obvious at the time the film was made. This would be Pryor's second to last film appearance.

One scene irrelevant to the plot features Rob Reiner as a limo driver, explaining his humorous philosophy on life to Dreyfuss. Reiner and Larry Bishop were once professional comedy partners.

Critical reception
The film was not well received by critics on release.  Roger Ebert gave the film a rare zero-star rating, noting:

Mad Dog Time is the first movie I have seen that does not improve on the sight of a blank screen viewed for the same length of time. Oh, I've seen bad movies before. But they usually made me care about how bad they were. Watching Mad Dog Time is like waiting for the bus in a city where you're not sure they have a bus line. ... Mad Dog Time should be cut into free ukulele picks for the poor.

Roger Ebert and partner Gene Siskel on their television show Siskel & Ebert at the Movies voted this the worst film of 1996. Ebert repeated his written statement that watching this movie was not preferable to 1 hour and 45 minutes of looking at a blank wall, and mentioned how upset he was that Siskel won the right to choose this film after a coin toss, so he had to pick the second worst film of the year, Un indien dans la ville (Little Indian, Big City), a film Ebert also gave zero stars. Siskel said that he still did not know what the film was about even six months after he saw it, and said that because in addition to starring in the film, Richard Dreyfuss is listed as a co-producer on the film, he deserves most of the blame for helping get the story on screen.

A New York Times review of November 8, 1996 by Stephen Holden called Mad Dog Time "a rat's nest of hip pretensions posing as a comedy."

In Entertainment Weekly on November 22, 1996, reviewer Ken Tucker described it as "jaw-droppingly incoherent."

The film holds a 17% rating on Rotten Tomatoes, based on 6 reviews.

References

External links
 
 
 
 

1996 films
1990s buddy comedy films
1990s crime comedy films
American buddy comedy films
Mafia comedy films
1990s English-language films
Films directed by Larry Bishop
United Artists films
1996 directorial debut films
1996 comedy films
1990s American films